is a former professional baseball player from Akashi, Hyōgo, Japan. After a nine-year career for the Hanshin Tigers, Fujimoto finished his career with the Tokyo Yakult Swallows before retiring at the end of the 2013 season. On 6 November 2014 it was announced that Fujimoto will return to Hanshin as an infield and baserunning coach for the farm team.

He joined the Japanese Olympic baseball team for the 2004 Summer Olympics, and won a bronze medal. He played in every inning of every game in the olympic tournament for the Japanese team.

References

External links

1977 births
Living people
Baseball players at the 2004 Summer Olympics
Hanshin Tigers players
Japanese baseball coaches
Medalists at the 2004 Summer Olympics
Nippon Professional Baseball coaches
Nippon Professional Baseball second basemen
Nippon Professional Baseball shortstops
Nippon Professional Baseball third basemen
Olympic baseball players of Japan
Olympic bronze medalists for Japan
Olympic medalists in baseball
Baseball people from Hyōgo Prefecture
Tokyo Yakult Swallows players
People from Akashi, Hyōgo